Tayarisha Poe is an American writer and director. Her directorial debut feature film Selah and the Spades won the Best Narrative Feature Award at the 2019 BlackStar Film Festival.

Life and career
Poe was raised in West Philadelphia. She received her bachelor's degree from Swarthmore College in 2012. She planned to pursue a career as an attorney but turned her interest to filmmaking in college. 

She named Terence Nance, Anna Rose Holmer, and Kasi Lemmons as three of her mentors.

Poe's directorial debut feature film and screenplay, Selah and the Spades, was released in 2019 on Amazon Prime. The film grew from a series of photos, short films, and prose she began posting online in 2014. The story received positive reception online, and Terence Nance agreed to executive produce the project. In 2016 she received support to develop the film through the Sundance Institute's Knight Foundation Fellowship. Selah and the Spades stars Lovie Simone, Jharrel Jerome, and Celeste O'Connor. The film received mainly positive reception.

Poe's upcoming feature film, The Young Wife, stars Kiersey Clemons, Judith Light, Leon Bridges, Sheryl Lee Ralph, and Kelly Marie Tran.

Awards and nominations 
 2015, Filmmaker, 25 New Faces of Independent Film
 2019, Variety, 10 Directors to Watch

Filmography

Film

Television

References

External links 
 Official website
 

Year of birth missing (living people)
Living people
African-American women writers
African-American directors
American women screenwriters
Writers from Philadelphia
Swarthmore College alumni